The Centre for Astrophysics and Supercomputing (CAS) is a research centre located at the Swinburne University in Melbourne, Australia. It was established in 1998.

The Centre comprises about 43 staff and 39 students engaged in diverse areas of astrophysical research.  It is actively involved in the planned Square Kilometre Array project. Computing resources include a 1950-node supercomputer.  The Centre is the only Australian institution to have an agreement with the W. M. Keck observatory, guaranteeing CAS researchers at least 15 nights per year.

Its motto is "Dedicated to inspiring a fascination in the universe through research and education".

External links 
 Facebook group
 CAS Homepage
 COSMOS - SAO Encyclopedia for Astronomy

Astronomy institutes and departments
Research institutes in Australia
Astrophysics institutes
1998 establishments in Australia